Radio 2 was a narrowband Australian radio network owned and operated by WorldAudio Limited. The network was broadcast on frequencies between 1611 and 1629 kHz via a series of 50 AM transmitters across Australia, as well as by satellite (including through Austar and Foxtel) and through the network's website.

History
Radio 2 began in Blacktown in Western Sydney on 1611 AM in October 2001, broadcasting under a Section 40 licence - meaning it could only operate on narrowband AM frequencies (1611–1701 kHz), and with narrow spectrum - 5 kHz, rather than the full 9 kHz which other commercial radio stations use. Branded "The New Voice Of Western Sydney", the station focused on live and local content, similar to 2WS in its heyday.

In 2002, Radio 2 was a broadcast partner of the 2002 FIFA World Cup, broadcasting live coverage of matches, with the call led by Colin Turner. In 2003, Radio 2 was a broadcast partner of the AFL, hosting live coverage of Sydney Swans home games from the Sydney Cricket Ground and Stadium Australia.

National expansion
In November 2003, owners WorldAudio Limited acquired a series of 14 additional transmitters, forming a national commercial AM radio network. This did not come without drama - a legal battle had begun between owners WorldAudio and GB Radio in Melbourne, over the use of the 1620 AM licence - WorldAudio would eventually use 1629 AM in Melbourne instead. In April 2005, owners WorldAudio signed Mikey Robins and Ian Rogerson to host The Big Australian Breakfast, Nick Bennett to host the Nick's Nation drive show, and former Seven News presenter Ross Symonds to host Sunday morning business program The Bottom Line.

In May 2005, the station launched nationally to a network of 50 stations around the country, dropping the Western Sydney focus and moving to programming of national significance. At launch, WorldAudio CEO Andrew Peter Thompson boasted the station "[could] be picked up by 93% of all radio receivers." Additional programming included Sportswatch Australia with Colin Turner, She Said with Sophie Falkiner and Katrina Warren, and Politically Direct with Paul Makin. The network had an emphasis on sporting coverage, with coverage of A-League and English Premier League soccer, AFL (including Sydney Swans and Brisbane Lions games, plus the 2005 AFL Grand Final), and the NBL.

Downfall and closure
However, the network's success wasn't to be. A combination of minimal listenership and low advertising lead to a trading halt being placed on parent company WorldAudio, with the announcement that administrators had been appointed to the company a week later. Administrators halted all talk based content, leaving the station to broadcast non-stop music.

Radio 2's frequencies were later sold, either to Rete Italia, the start-up Vision Christian Radio, or to the similarly ill-fated Goanna country music network.

Availability (at time of closure)

References

Defunct radio stations in Australia
Radio stations established in 2001
Radio stations disestablished in 2006
Defunct Australian radio networks
Radio stations in Sydney
Radio stations in New South Wales
Radio stations in Brisbane
Radio stations in Queensland
Radio stations in Melbourne
Radio stations in Victoria
Radio stations in Adelaide
Radio stations in South Australia
Radio stations in Perth, Western Australia
Radio stations in Western Australia
Radio stations in Darwin, Northern Territory
Radio stations in the Northern Territory
Companies formerly listed on the Australian Securities Exchange
2001 establishments in Australia
2006 disestablishments in Australia